Nyal Christian-Anthony Higgins (born January 19, 1998) is a Canadian professional soccer player.

College 
In 2016, he attended Oakland University, playing for the Golden Grizzlies soccer team. As a freshman, he was named to the Horizon League All-Freshman Team and the NSCAA All-Great Lakes Regional Third Team. In his sophomore and junior seasons, he was named to the All-Horizon League Second Team. In 2019, he transferred to Syracuse University to play for the Syracuse Orange soccer team.

Club career 
During the 2016 and 2018 seasons, he played with Vaughan Azzurri in League1 Ontario. In 2017, he played with the Michigan Bucks in the Premier Development League. In 2018, he trained with three Major League Soccer clubs - Sporting Kansas City, Columbus Crew SC, and Nashville SC. He later trained with Toronto FC in 2019.

He was selected 19th overall by Toronto FC in the 2020 MLS SuperDraft. He attended pre-season with the club, but ultimately did not make the final roster for 2020. In July, he signed a USL contract with the second-team Toronto FC II. He was soon after sent on loan to Nyköpings BIS in the Swedish third tier, following TFC II's withdrawal from the 2020 USL League One season due to the COVID-19 pandemic. He scored his first goal on November 21, in a 7-1 defeat to IF Brommapojkarna. He made his debut for Toronto FC II on May 22, 2021 against North Texas SC.

In August 2021, Higgins joined Canadian Premier League side Atlético Ottawa on loan. He made his debut in a substitute appearance, on August 25, against Forge FC.

In February 2022, he signed a contract with FC Edmonton in the Canadian Premier League.

International career
He was a member of the U18 and U20 Canadian national team talent pools.

Career statistics

References

External links

1998 births
Association football defenders
Atlético Ottawa players
Canadian expatriate soccer players
Canadian expatriate sportspeople in Sweden
Canadian Premier League players
Canadian soccer players
Ettan Fotboll players
Expatriate footballers in Sweden
FC Edmonton players
League1 Ontario players
Living people
Flint City Bucks players
Nyköpings BIS players
Oakland Golden Grizzlies men's soccer players
Soccer people from Ontario
Syracuse Orange men's soccer players
Toronto FC draft picks
Toronto FC II players
USL League One players
USL League Two players
Vaughan Azzurri players